The Remix Collection is a remix album by Kim Wilde. The album was released in 1993 in Japan and later in Australia. It contains some of her hits in long versions. For the first time available on CD are "The Second Time" U.S. Mix, "Never Trust a Stranger" Sanjazz Mix, and "Four Letter Word" Late Night Mix. A techno-style mix of "Kids in America" is included.

To promote the album, "Kids in America 1994" was released as a single in May 1994 in several European countries, which featured remixes by Italian Eurodance project Cappella. The remix was not included on the album itself.

The album peaked at No. 64 on the Australian ARIA albums chart in March 1994.

Track listing
"If I Can't Have You (John Robinson Mix)" – 4:36
"Kids in America (The Maranza Mix)" – 5:06
"The Second Time (U.S. Remix)" – 5:23
"Rage to Love (Extended Version)" – 5:59
"You Keep Me Hangin' On (W.C.H. Mix)" – 9:03
"Another Step (Closer to You) (Extended Mix)" –  5:51
"You Came (The Close Remix)" – 6:41
"Never Trust a Stranger (Sanjazz Mix)" – 5:44
"Four Letter Word (Late Night Mix)" – 3:55
"Love Is Holy (Ambient Mix)" – 4:44
"If I Can't Have You (Extended Version)" – 6:29
"In My Life (West End 12" Remix)" – 4:57

Charts

References

Kim Wilde compilation albums
1993 remix albums
1993 compilation albums